Eagleville is an unincorporated community in Wood County, in the U.S. state of Ohio.

History
Eagleville was platted in 1852. Variant names were Bloom and Ted. A post office called Ted was established in 1885, and remained in operation until 1904.

References

Unincorporated communities in Wood County, Ohio
Unincorporated communities in Ohio